Kramer vs. Kramer is a 1979 American legal drama film written and directed by Robert Benton, based on Avery Corman's 1977 novel of the same name. The film stars Dustin Hoffman, Meryl Streep, Jane Alexander, and Justin Henry.
It tells the story of a couple's divorce, its impact on their young son, and the subsequent evolution of their relationship and views on parenting.

The film explores the psychology and fallout of divorce and touches upon prevailing or emerging social issues such as gender roles, women's rights, feminism, fathers' rights, work-life balance, and single parents.

Kramer vs. Kramer was theatrically released on December 19, 1979, by Columbia Pictures. It was a major critical and commercial success, grossing over $173 million on an $8 million budget, becoming the highest-grossing film of 1979 in the United States and Canada and receiving a leading nine nominations at the 52nd Academy Awards, winning five (more than any other film nominated that year); Best Picture, Best Director, Best Actor (for Hoffman), Best Supporting Actress (for Streep), and Best Adapted Screenplay.

Plot
Ted Kramer, a workaholic advertising executive in New York City, has just landed an important account and been promoted. However, when he shares the news with his wife Joanna, he discovers that she is leaving him and their son Billy. Initially, Ted and Billy struggle to bond as Ted's workload increases and Billy misses his mother. Nevertheless, they eventually learn to cope and form a strong connection.

Ted befriends his neighbor Margaret Phelps, to whom Joanna had confided. As fellow single parents, Ted and Margaret become close friends. While watching their children play in the park, Billy falls off the jungle gym and is injured. Ted rushes him to the hospital and comforts him during treatment.

Fifteen months later, Joanna returns from California to claim custody of Billy, leading to a contentious legal battle. Their lawyers resort to brutal character assassinations, and Margaret is compelled to testify against Ted, revealing that she had advised Joanna to leave him. Ted's job loss and Billy's accident are also used to discredit him.

Despite his desire to appeal, Ted's lawyer advises against it, as putting Billy on the stand would be emotionally damaging. Ted eventually decides not to contest custody. On the day Joanna comes to collect Billy, Ted and Billy prepare breakfast together. Joanna tells Ted that she wishes she had painted Billy's new room like his old one and tearfully admits that his true home is with Ted. As she enters the elevator to talk to Billy one last time, Ted tells her she looks "terrific."

Cast
 Dustin Hoffman as Ted Kramer
 Meryl Streep as Joanna (Stern) Kramer
 Justin Henry as Billy Kramer
 Jane Alexander as Margaret Phelps
 Petra King as Petie Phelps
 Melissa Morell as Kim Phelps
 Howard Duff as John Shaunessy
 George Coe as Jim O'Connor
 JoBeth Williams as Phyllis Bernard
 Howland Chamberlain as Judge Atkins
 Dan Tyra as Court Clerk

Production
Producer Stanley R. Jaffe and writer and director Robert Benton read Avery Corman's source novel and were so moved by the story that they bought the rights to make it into a movie. Dustin Hoffman was the only actor they envisioned in the lead role of Ted Kramer. 

Hoffman, himself going through a divorce at the time, initially turned down the role. He has since stated that at that time he had wanted to quit film acting and return to the stage due to his depression and distaste for Hollywood. While Jaffe and Benton were courting Hoffman, James Caan was offered the role but turned it down as he was concerned the film would be a flop. Al Pacino was offered the role but felt that it was not for him. Jon Voight turned down the role. Hoffman met with Jaffe and Benton at a London hotel during the making of Agatha and was convinced to accept the role. Hoffman has credited Benton and this film for rejuvenating his love of film acting and inspiring the emotional level of many scenes. Hoffman was reminded of his love for children and "got closer being a father by playing a father."

Benton and Jaffe selected Justin Henry to play Billy. Hoffman worked extensively with Henry, then 7 years old, in each scene to put him at ease. Benton encouraged Henry to improvise to make his performance more natural. The famous ice cream scene where Billy defies Ted by skipping dinner and eating ice cream was all improvised by Hoffman and Henry. Hoffman contributed many personal moments and dialogue; Benton offered shared screenplay credit but Hoffman declined.

Kate Jackson was offered the role of Joanna Kramer but had to turn it down as producer Aaron Spelling was unable to rearrange the shooting schedule of the TV series Charlie's Angels, in which Jackson was starring. The part was offered to Faye Dunaway, Jane Fonda and Ali MacGraw, before Meryl Streep was cast.

Streep was initially cast as Phyllis (the role eventually taken by JoBeth Williams), but she was able to force her way into auditioning for Joanna in front of Hoffman, Benton, and Jaffe. She found the character in the novel and script unsympathetic ("an ogre, a princess, an ass", as she called her) and approached Joanna from a more sympathetic point of view. Hoffman believed that the death of Streep's fiancé, John Cazale, only months earlier, gave her an emotional edge and "still-fresh pain" to draw on for the performance. Streep was only contracted to work 12 days on the film.

Gail Strickland was first cast as Ted's neighbor Margaret, but departed after a week of filming (according to Columbia Pictures due to "artistic differences") and was replaced by Jane Alexander. Michael Schulman claims Strickland was so rattled by the intensity of filming with Hoffman that she developed a stammer, making her lines difficult to follow. Strickland herself disputes this account, saying that she couldn't quickly memorize improvised lines that Hoffman gave her, which agitated him and she was fired two days later.

Cinematographer Néstor Almendros, a collaborator on numerous François Truffaut films, had been hired with the expectation that Truffaut would direct. Truffaut turned it down as he was busy with his own projects, and suggested  screenwriter Robert Benton direct the film himself.

JoBeth Williams was hesitant about shucking her clothes, especially in the scene with a young Justin Henry. "I was afraid my nudity would traumatize the little boy," she said.

Controversy
Hoffman has been widely reported to have harassed Streep during the making of the movie, and the two had a contentious working relationship. In a 1979 Time magazine interview, Streep claimed that Hoffman groped her breast on their first meeting. When Streep advocated portraying Joanna as more sympathetic and vulnerable than she was written, she received pushback from Hoffman. Such was his commitment to method acting, he would hurl insults and obscenities at Streep, taunt her with the name of her recently deceased fiancé, John Cazale, claiming it was designed to draw a better performance from her. He famously shattered a wine glass against the wall without telling her (although he did inform the cameraman beforehand), sending glass shards into her hair. Her response was: "Next time you do that, I'd appreciate you letting me know." Hoffman slapped her hard without warning while filming a scene, she said in 2018: "This was my first movie, and it was my first take in my first movie, and he just slapped me. And you see it in the movie. It was overstepping."

Reception
Kramer vs. Kramer received positive reviews from critics. It holds an 89% approval rating on review aggregator Rotten Tomatoes based on 99 reviews, with an average score of 8.20/10. The consensus reads: "The divorce subject isn't as shocking, but the film is still a thoughtful, well-acted drama that resists the urge to take sides or give easy answers." It received a score of 77 on Metacritic, based on nine reviews.

Roger Ebert of the Chicago Sun-Times gave the film four stars, giving praise to Benton's screenplay: "His characters aren't just talking to each other, they're revealing things about themselves and can sometimes be seen in the act of learning about their own motives. That's what makes Kramer vs. Kramer such a touching film: We get the feeling at times that personalities are changing and decisions are being made even as we watch them." Vincent Canby of The New York Times called it a "fine, witty, moving, most intelligent adaptation of Avery Corman's best-selling novel," with Streep giving "one of the major performances of the year" and Hoffman "splendid in one of the two or three best roles of his career." Gene Siskel of the Chicago Tribune gave the film four stars out of four and wrote, Kramer vs. Kramer' never loses its low-key, realistic touch. You will sit at the end of the film wondering why we don't see more pictures like this. After all, its story is not all that unusual." He thought that Hoffman gave "one of his most memorable performances" and "should win the Academy Award next April." Variety wrote, "Stories on screen about men leaving women, and women leaving men have been abundant as of late, but hardly any has grappled with the issue in such a forthright and honest fashion as 'Kramer' ... While a nasty court battle ensues, the human focus is never abandoned, and it's to the credit of not only Benton and Jaffe, but especially Hoffman and Streep, that both leading characters emerge as credible and sympathetic." Charles Champlin of the Los Angeles Times declared it "as nearly perfect a film as can be" and "a motion picture with an emotional wallop second to none this year." Gary Arnold of The Washington Post called the film "a triumph of partisan pathos, a celebration of father-son bonding that astutely succeeds where tearjerkers like The Champ so mawkishly failed." Stanley Kauffmann of The New Republic wrote "All the people go through expected difficulties the way that runners take the hurdles in a track event: no surprise in it, it's just a question of how they do it. But the actors make it more."

Shortly after the film's release, The New York Times and Time magazine published separate articles in which members of the bar and bench criticized the court battle scenes as "legally out of date." According to the legal experts interviewed for the articles, a modern judge would have made use of psychological reports and also considered the wishes of the child; another criticism was that the option of joint custody was never explored.

In 2003, The New York Times placed the film on its Best 1000 Movies Ever list.

The film grossed $5,559,722 in its opening week from 534 theatres. It went on to gross $106.3 million in the United States and Canada. In its first 13 weeks overseas, it had grossed over $67 million. It went on to become Columbia's highest-grossing film overseas with theatrical rentals of $57 million until surpassed in 1990 by Look Who's Talking (released by Columbia TriStar internationally).

Cultural impact
Kramer vs. Kramer reflected a cultural shift which occurred during the 1970s, when ideas about motherhood and fatherhood were changing.  The film was widely praised for the way in which it gave equal weight and importance to both Joanna and Ted's points of view.

The film made use of the first movement of Antonio Vivaldi's Mandolin Concerto in C Major, making the piece more familiar among classical music listeners.

The song, Mon fils, ma bataille, about a painful divorce and a father's struggle to keep custody of his child, was inspired by Daniel Balavoine's parents' divorce, his guitarist Colin Swinburne's divorce and also by the film Kramer vs. Kramer (1980).

Awards and nominations

American Film Institute Lists
 AFI's 100 Years...100 Movies – Nominated
 AFI's 100 Years...100 Movies (10th Anniversary Edition) – Nominated
 AFI's 10 Top 10 – #3 Courtroom Drama

Adaptation
In 1990, the film was remade in Turkish as Oğulcan, directed and acted by Cüneyt Arkın, in Hindi as Akele Hum Akele Tum in 1995, starring Aamir Khan and Manisha Koirala and in Urdu as Zindagi Kitni Haseen Hay in 2016 starring Sajal Ali and Feroze Khan.

See also
 Trial film

Explanatory notes

References

External links

 
 
 
 
 

1979 films
1979 drama films
1970s legal films
1970s American films
American legal drama films
Best Drama Picture Golden Globe winners
Best Picture Academy Award winners
Columbia Pictures films
American courtroom films
1970s English-language films
Films about dysfunctional families
Films about lawyers
Films based on American novels
Films directed by Robert Benton
Films featuring a Best Actor Academy Award-winning performance
Films featuring a Best Drama Actor Golden Globe winning performance
Films featuring a Best Supporting Actress Academy Award-winning performance
Films featuring a Best Supporting Actress Golden Globe-winning performance
Films set in New York City
Films shot in New York City
Films whose director won the Best Directing Academy Award
Films whose writer won the Best Adapted Screenplay Academy Award
Films with screenplays by Robert Benton
Films about divorce
Films about father–son relationships
Films about parenting